The Maude Group is a geologic group in British Columbia. It preserves fossils dating back to the Early Jurassic period.

See also 
 List of fossiliferous stratigraphic units in British Columbia

References

Geologic groups of North America
Geologic formations of Canada
Jurassic System of North America
Jurassic British Columbia